"Morning Glow" is a 1973 single released by Michael Jackson on the Motown label. It was the singer's second single release from the album Music & Me. The song was not released as a single in the US. Meanwhile, it was released in United Kingdom, Ireland, Panama and Australia where it reached number 98. "Morning Glow" is a song from the musical Pippin.

Charts

Credits
Lead and background vocals by Michael Jackson

1973 singles
Michael Jackson songs
Motown singles